Aa schickendanzii is a species of orchid in the genus Aa.

It is endemic to northwest Argentina.

References

schickendanzii
Plants described in 1920
Endemic flora of Argentina